Power Move is the third studio album by the Screaming Females released by Don Giovanni Records on April 4, 2009. It was their first on Don Giovanni Records and their first not to be self-released.

Track listing
All songs written by Screaming Females (Jarrett Dougherty, Mike "King Mike" Abbate, Marissa Paternoster).
 "Bell"  – 2:24
 "Sour Grapes"  – 2:25
 "Skull"  – 4:40
 "Treacher Collins"  – 3:59
 "Starving Dog"  – 2:41
 "Lights Out"  – 4:07
 "I Believe In Evil"  – 2:59
 "Adult Army"  – 4:59
 "Halfway Down"  – 2:37
 "Buried In The Nude"  – 3:18

References

Screaming Females albums
Don Giovanni Records albums
2009 albums